Bearpark is a village and civil parish in County Durham in England. It is situated two and a half miles west of Durham, and a short distance to the north of Ushaw Moor.
The name may be a corruption of the French term Beau Repaire – meaning "beautiful retreat". Half a mile to the north of the present village lies the ruins of Beaurepaire Priory, built in 1258 by the Prior of Durham, Bertram de Middleton, as a retirement residence. The building was extended in the subsequent three centuries, becoming a retreat for the Durham monks in a similar way to the nearby Finchale Priory. The manor was largely destroyed by the Scots in 1640 and 1644 during the British Civil War.  In 1872, Theodore Fry was involved in founding the Bearpark Coal and Coke Company, which established a coal mine in Bearpark until 1984, when the mine was closed.

Bearpark Community Centre is at the hub of the local village, a red brick building originally built in 1921 as a miners' welfare hall. An old pit wheel stands in front of the building, a memorial to the village's mining history.

References
Margot Johnson. "Beaurepaire" in Durham: Historic and University City and surrounding area. Sixth Edition. Turnstone Ventures. 1992. . Page 33.

4. ^ "A Mining World: The Story of Bearpark County Durham".

External links

 Bearpark-Online : Many Photos of Bearpark and Beaurepaire
 Durham Mining Museum information on Bearpark Colliery
 Subterranea Britannica entry on Bearpark Station
 Keys to the Past's notes on Bearpark.
 City of Durham Council's notes on Beaurepaire

 
Villages in County Durham
Civil parishes in County Durham